Deh Now-e Abd ol Maleki (also Romanized as Deh Now-e ‘Abd ol Malekī and Dehnow-e ‘Abdol Malakī; also known as Damū”eh, Deh Nau, Dehnow, and Demoa) is a village in Khezel-e Sharqi Rural District, Khezel District, Nahavand County, Hamadan Province, Iran. At the 2006 census, its population was 933, in 231 families.

References 

Populated places in Nahavand County